Shankarapur is a village in Ranga Reddy district in Telangana, India. It falls under Shamshabad mandal. It is close to ORR and NH7.

References

Villages in Ranga Reddy district